Western State may refer to:
 Western State (Nigeria), a former state in Nigeria
 Western State Conference, a sport association of California community colleges
 Western State Colorado University, former name until 2018 of Western Colorado University
 Western State College of Law
 Missouri Western State University

See also
 Western States Endurance Run
 Western States Hockey League
 The Western State Hurricanes
 Western State Hospital (disambiguation)